Halenia longicaulis is a species of plant in the Gentianaceae family. It is endemic to Ecuador.  Its natural habitat is subtropical or tropical high-altitude shrubland.

References

longicaulis
Endemic flora of Ecuador
Least concern plants
Least concern biota of South America
Taxonomy articles created by Polbot